Suphi is a Turkish name of Arabic origin (صبحي) that may refer to
Suphi Nuri İleri (1887–1945), Turkish politician and writer
Hamdullah Suphi Tanrıöver (1885–1966), Turkish poet and politician
Mehmet Suphi Kula (1881–1948), Turkish military officer 
Mustafa Suphi (1883–1921), Turkish communist leader

See also
Sobhi

Turkish-language surnames